This is a list of awards and nominations received by filmmaker Rohit Gupta.

Awards and nominations

Times NRI of the Year

Limca Book of Records

References

External links 
 Rohit Gupta at the Internet Movie Database
 Midnight Delight at the Internet Movie Database
 Life! Camera Action... at the Internet Movie Database
 Another Day Another Life at the Internet Movie Database

Gupta